Manslaughter is a 2012 Dutch thriller film directed by Pieter Kuijpers starring Theo Maassen.

Cast
 Theo Maassen - Max
 Gijs Scholten van Aschat - Felix
 Maryam Hassouni - Amira
 Mamoun Elyounoussi - Achmed
 Najib Amhali - Father of Mo 
 Jeffrey Hamilton - Patrick

References

External links 

2012 thriller films
2012 films
Dutch thriller films
2010s Dutch-language films